Szumów  is a village in the administrative district of Gmina Kurów, within Puławy County, Lublin Voivodeship, in eastern Poland.

The village has a population of 148.

References

Villages in Puławy County